James Calvin Vechery (born July 26, 1966) is a retired lieutenant general in the United States Air Force, who last served as the Deputy to the Commander for Military Operations of United States Africa Command. He was commissioned upon graduating from the University of Maryland in 1988, through the Air Force Reserve Officers' Training Corps.

Awards and decorations

References

1966 births
United States Air Force personnel of the War in Afghanistan (2001–2021)
Living people
Recipients of the Air Medal
Recipients of the Defense Superior Service Medal
Recipients of the Legion of Merit
University of Maryland, College Park alumni
Webster University alumni